Lágymányos is a neighbourhood in the district of Újbuda in Budapest, Hungary. In 2001, Lágymányos had a population of 19,741. The Budapest University of Technology and Economics is located here, as well as some faculties of Eötvös Loránd University.

The neighbourhood is served by a number of tram and bus lines, including the 4 and 6 trams.

Neighbourhoods of Budapest